

See also
Standard (disambiguation)
Bollocks#Positive uses